The Interactive Institute (also known as Interactive Institute Swedish ICT) is an experimental research institute in the fields of information and communications technology, interaction design, and visualization, operating in Sweden. The Interactive Institute was founded in 1998 by the Swedish Foundation for Strategic Research, and is owned by Research Institutes of Sweden (RISE) through the Swedish ICT group.

The institute employs 55 people and operates in 8 Swedish cities; Kista Science City (HQ) outside Stockholm, Piteå, Umeå, Karlstad, Uppsala, Eskilstuna, Norrköping, and Gothenburg.

External links 
 The Interactive Institute website

Research institutes in Sweden
1998 establishments in Sweden
Information technology in Sweden
Human–computer interaction